Steel Breeze is an American rock group that had a US hit with the song "You Don't Want Me Anymore" in 1982. This was followed by their single "Dreamin' is Easy" the following year.

Career
Taking their name from a phrase in Pink Floyd's song, "Shine On You Crazy Diamond", the six-member band from Sacramento, California comprised—in its "classic" lineup—Ric Jacobs (vocals), Ken Goorabian and Waylin Carpenter (guitars), Rod Toner (keyboards), Vinnie Pantaleoni (bass guitar), and Barry Lowenthal (drums), released their self-titled debut album in 1982 on RCA Records.  "You Don't Want Me Anymore", the first single from the album, quickly jumped into the Top 20 on the Billboard Hot 100 supported by a video that was a favorite of early MTV, and peaked at No. 16.  The next single, "Dreamin' Is Easy", also made it into the Top 40 but went no higher than No. 30.

The group originally had a different lineup a few years earlier and enjoyed some local success with "You Don't Want Me Anymore" with the work of manager John Wiseman before catching the attention of producer Kim Fowley and attorney David Chatfield, who recorded the band's first album at Rusk Studios in Hollywood and secured Steel Breeze their recording contract with RCA Records.  On the March 12, 1983 edition of American Top 40, Casey Kasem described how Fowley discovered Steel Breeze while going through approximately 1200 demo tapes that were about to be discarded by a local Hollywood night club, Madam Wongs.  Chatfield and Fowley flew up to Sacramento and signed the band after Chrysalis Record executive Tom Trumbo told Chatfield he was looking for a band like Journey. Chatfield left Trumbo's office and went to Fowley's home where Fowley pulled out the Steel Breeze demo of "You Don't Want Me Anymore," which they both knew was a hit.

The band's lineup has shifted considerably since the release of the debut album, with keyboardist Rod Toner remaining in the band the longest of anyone from the classic lineup days.  In 1984, Steel Breeze (now with ex-707 vocalist Kevin Chalfant and keyboardist Loren Haas as members) released their second album, Heart on the Line on an independent record label, but the record went unnoticed despite guest appearances by Bruce Springsteen's saxophonist, Clarence Clemons and Santana's vocalist, Alex Ligertwood.  Five years later, a third Steel Breeze album, Cry Thunder came out with Bobby Thompson on vocals, Rick Lowe and Robbie Bickford on guitar, Toner on keyboards and Paul Ojeda on drums. In 1991, Still Warrior was released with yet another lineup, just as Chalfant had a small hit with a similar act, The Storm. In 1994, Peace Of Mind was issued.

Richard "Ric" L. Jacobs (born December 30, 1956, Moline, Illinois) died on January 17, 2018, Oakwood Hills, Illinois, at age 61.

Discography
1982 – Steel Breeze
1983 – Heart on the Line
1989 – Cry Thunder
1991 – Still Warriors
1994 – Peace of Mind

Charting Singles

References

External links
Spirit of Metal
Renaissance Records website

Rock music groups from California
Musical groups from Sacramento, California